is a Japanese footballer currently playing as a left-back for FC Imabari.

Career statistics

Club
.

Notes

References

External links

1997 births
Living people
Japanese footballers
Association football defenders
Ryutsu Keizai University alumni
Japan Football League players
J3 League players
FC Imabari players